The Unknown Woman (La sconosciuta) is a 2006 Italian film.

Unknown Woman or The Unknown Woman may also refer to:

Unknown Woman (film), a 1935 American film
The Unknown Woman (film) (El murra el maghoula), a 1959 Egyptian film
Unknown Woman (TV series) (Ireum Eobsneun Yeoja), a 2017 South Korean TV series
Letter from an Unknown Woman, a 1922 Zweig novella
Letter from an Unknown Woman (1948 film)
Letter from an Unknown Woman (2004 film)
Portrait of an Unknown Woman, a 1883 Kramskoi painting
Portrait of an Unknown Woman (film), a 1954 West German film
Portrait of an Unknown Woman (novel), a 2022 Daniel Silva novel (not related to the film)
Fräulein Unbekannt (Miss Unknown), or Anna Anderson, impostor who claimed to be Grand Duchess Anastasia of Russia